David Malukas (born September 27, 2001) is a Lithuanian-American race car driver who competes in the IndyCar Series for Dale Coyne Racing.

Career

Lower formula
In 2016 and the early part of 2017, Malukas competed in the Formula 4 UAE Championship for Rasgaira Motorsports. He did not contest the full season but still finished sixth in the championship. 

Malukas would move to ADAC Formula 4 to compete for Motopark in 2017. There he would end up finishing nineteenth in the championship.

U.S. F2000 National Championship
Along with his efforts in ADAC Formula 4, Malukas would compete in the U.S. F2000 National Championship in 2017 for BN Racing. At the first race at Road America, he took pole position and finished on the podium in second.

Pro Mazda Championship
After competing part-time in the U.S. F2000 National Championship the previous year, Malukas would move up to the Pro Mazda Championship in 2018 again driving for BN Racing. BN Racing was owned by Malukas' father Henry Malukas. He would have an impressive season with three wins and six podiums to finish fourth in the championship.

Formula Regional Americas Championship
Due to the 2020 Indy Lights season being cancelled in 2020, Malukas would compete in the Formula Regional Americas Championship for HMD Motorsports. He had a successful season claiming two wins and fifteen podiums to finish second in the championship.

Indy Lights
In 2019, Malukas would once again move up a rung in the Road to Indy ladder to the Indy Lights series driving for BN Racing. In 2019, BN Racing was renamed to HMD Motorsports. Malukas would only have two podiums at Circuit of the Americas and Gateway Motorsports Park respectively.

Malukas was set to compete in the series in 2020, however the season was cancelled due to the COVID-19 pandemic.

After 2020, Malukas returned to the series in 2021 once again with HMD Motorsports. He would claim his maiden pole at the second race at Barber Motorsports Park and would go on to get his first win in the series. Malukas would challenge rookie Kyle Kirkwood for the title all season but ultimately finished second in the standings behind Kirkwood. He would have his most impressive season in any category thus far with six poles, sixteen podiums and seven wins.

IndyCar
On December 15, 2021, it was announced that Malukas would drive the No. 18 entry full-time for Dale Coyne Racing in partnership with HMD Motorsports during the 2022 IndyCar Series season. At Mid-Ohio, he would finish a career best ninth being his first top-10 of the season. At the next race in Toronto, Malukas made it into the Firestone Fast 6 for a second time that season and qualified a career best fifth. Malukas took his first podium at Gateway, nearly passing his idol Josef Newgarden for the win on the last lap before ultimately settling for second place.

Racing record

Career summary

American open–wheel racing results

U.S. F2000 National Championship

Pro Mazda Championship

Indy Lights

 1 BN Racing became HMD Motorsports in August 2019

Formula Regional Americas Championship

IndyCar Series
(key)

Indianapolis 500

Notes

References

External links
 

2001 births
Living people
ADAC Formula 4 drivers
American people of Lithuanian descent
IndyCar Series drivers
Indianapolis 500 drivers
Indy Lights drivers
Indy Pro 2000 Championship drivers
Racing drivers from Illinois
U.S. F2000 National Championship drivers
Formula Regional Americas Championship drivers
Motopark Academy drivers
Dale Coyne Racing drivers
Karting World Championship drivers
Lithuanian racing drivers
UAE F4 Championship drivers
HMD Motorsports drivers